William H. Brodnax (also Broadnax), (1786 – October 23, 1834) was a nineteenth-century American militia Brigadier General and American politician from Virginia.

Early life
Born in Brunswick County, Virginia, Broadnax graduated from Hampden-Sydney College having studied law, and later received an honorary Master of Arts degree from there in 1830 at age forty-four following his service as a delegate to the Virginia Constitutional Convention of 1829-1830.

Career

Brodnax began practicing the Law in Petersburg, Virginia.

Brodnax twice served as a member of the Virginia House of Delegates, once from 1818–1819 and again from 1830–1833. He was also a member of the American Colonization Society.

Over the course of a military career in the Virginia militia, Brodnax attained the rank of Brigadier General. In 1824, he was appointed by the Virginia state legislature to meet General Lafayette on his arrival at Baltimore, Maryland. He served as the chief marshal at Yorktown, Virginia, when Lafayette visited.

Early on in his political career, Brodnax was a member of the Whig Party. Broadnax was a presidential elector in 1825. He served as a delegate in the Virginia Constitutional Convention of 1829-1830 as one of four delegates from the state senatorial district including his home county of Dinwiddie, Brunswick, Lunenburg and Mecklenburg.

In August 1831, Brodnax served as commanding general of the Virginia militia during the Nat Turner slave rebellion in Southampton County, Virginia. The next month he represented, along with his brother Meriwether Brodnax, several slaves accused of participating in Nat Turner's slave rebellion in Sussex.  In 1832 during the Virginia legislature's debate about slavery Brodnax spoke in favor of colonization of free African Americans.

Death
Brodnax died of cholera on October 23, 1834 and was buried in the cemetery at Dimwiddie County Courthouse. His will was probated in Dinwiddie County in December 1834.

References

Bibliography

External links
 

1786 births
1834 deaths
Hampden–Sydney College alumni
19th-century American lawyers
Members of the Virginia House of Delegates
People from Brunswick County, Virginia
19th-century American politicians